Clarity is the debut mixtape and first full-length album by German singer Kim Petras, released on 28 June 2019. Nine of its twelve tracks were released beforehand, beginning in April 2019. It was produced by Made in China, Aaron Joseph, Brandon Hamlin, Jussifer, Oliver and Ben Billions. Musically, it contains elements of synth-pop, bubblegum pop, hip hop, contemporary R&B, glam rock and emo pop. Petras stated that this project is her "personal journey over the last two years", and it has received widespread critical acclaim.

The first song that was released from Clarity was "Broken", on 25 April 2019 written by Petras herself and co-writer Anthony Medina. Petras later released one song every week to streaming services after that for ten weeks. Petras confirmed on Twitter that the tenth song that was released from Clarity, "Icy", was the actual lead single. To promote the album, Petras embarked on the Clarity Tour starting with North America and then Europe. Although it was originally promoted as her debut album, Petras has described Clarity as a "project".

Background and composition
Petras has said the project is "about finding myself. It started with 'Broken' and will end with 'Clarity' because it reflects my personal journey over the last two years." Nine of the songs were released in advance, including the "breakup anthem" "Broken", "downtempo" song "All I Do Is Cry", the "hookup anthem" "Do Me", and the "bouncy banger" "Personal Hell".

The album contains elements of synth-pop, bubblegum pop, hip hop, contemporary R&B, glam rock and emo pop.

Critical reception

On Metacritic, the album received a score of 83 out of 100, indicating "universal acclaim". Variety called the project "sturdy pop songcraft" and compared it favorably to Robyn's 1995 album Robyn Is Here, also making a comparison between Petras' career trajectory and that of Lorde. Comparing the record to the early 2000s pop hits of Britney Spears and Christina Aguilera, The Guardian gave the album 4 out of 5 stars and praised its power-pop sound. It also wrote that Petras' "addictively crafted bubblegum pop" makes her "sound like a superstar from a parallel universe", and praised her musical experimentation. Writing for Stereogum, Chris DeVille identified the main theme of the album as "looking for release through sex and materialism". DeVille noted that it marks a shift in Petras' content from "sparkling pop sound into a mistier, sadder, more hip-hop-adjacent territory" and praised it as "an impressive collection". Tyler Mazaheri of Flaunt favored the album's nontraditional single-a-week promotion and praised the project for its "catchy choruses layered over danceable beats", adding that "the album is sure to pack all the bops [audiences will] be hearing in the club for the unforeseeable future." In his review of the single "Icy", Michael Love Michael of Paper proclaimed "Kim Petras just might have released one of this year's most compelling pop collections."

Promotion

Prior to the release of Clarity, Petras began embarking on her 24-stop promotional tour, The Broken Tour. Through May and June, Petras appeared on a number of magazine covers including ones for Galore, The Gay Times, Flaunt, Notion, and AtKode.

Singles
Petras released the first song from Clarity, "Broken", on 25 April 2019. Petras released one song every week to streaming services after that for ten weeks in preparation for her debut concert tour Broken Tour. Petras later confirmed on Twitter that the tenth song to be released from the album, "Icy", was the actual lead single. "All I Do Is Cry", which was released as the fifth promotional single on 23 May 2019, was re-released on streaming services with a changed date to 2021 under the Amigo and Republic record labels. It is unclear whether the song was re-released as the second single.

Track listing

Charts

See also
 31st GLAAD Media Awards

References

2019 debut albums
Albums produced by Dr. Luke
Kim Petras albums
Electropop albums
Bubblegum pop albums